Bucknell Wood Meadows is a  biological Site of Special Scientific Interest north-west of Silverstone in Northamptonshire.

This site consists of agriculturally unimproved fields on seasonally waterlogged soils. The flora is diverse with many herbs, including bird's-foot-trefoil, meadow buttercup and devil's-bit scabious. Variations in the types of flora are partly due to different soils and partly to previous management practices.

There is access from public footpaths which pass through the site.

References

Sites of Special Scientific Interest in Northamptonshire